The Botanical Garden Erlangen is a botanical garden, which is 2 hectares in size, maintained by the University of Erlangen-Nuremberg and located on the north side of the castle garden in the city center at Loschgestraße 3, Erlangen, Franconia, Germany. It is open daily except Monday.

The garden's origins date back to 1626 when the hortus medicus was established in Altdorf bei Nürnberg. In 1747 the first botanical garden in Erlangen was established in front of the former Nuremberg Gate, and since 1828 the botanical garden has been established at its current location.

Today the garden contains about 4,000 species representing a wide range of plants of different climates, including those maintained within greenhouses (about 1700 m2). The garden also contains Neischl Grotto, an artificial cave renovated in May 2008. The Herbarium Erlangense is a herbarium containing about 158,000 records from around the world.

See also 
 List of botanical gardens in Germany

References

External links 

 Botanischer Garten Erlangen
 Hermann von Helmholtz-Zentrum entry
 BGCI entry
 Flickr photos
 FrankenRadar photos

Erlangen, Botanischer Garten
Erlangen, Botanischer Garten